The Château de Malherbes is a château and vineyard located in the commune of Latresne in Gironde, Nouvelle-Aquitaine, France.

References

Châteaux in Gironde
Bordeaux wine producers